Kettlebowl is a small ski area near Bryant, Wisconsin, founded in 1956 and  run as a non-profit operation by volunteers of the Langlade County Ski Club.

The name Kettlebowl comes from the Kettle Moraine, a large moraine, or glacial deposit, in Northern Wisconsin. The Ice Age Trail route passes through Kettlebowl.

History
The hill was created in 1956 and was first known as "Kettlehole Bowl". Two tractors donated by the Antigo Cooperative Oil Association powered the tow ropes. Skiers could shelter in a Depression-era lodge hauled to the site that reportedly was a Civilian Conservation Corps structure.  In 2005 the old lodge was replaced by a new building with electricity and indoor restrooms.

Description and location
The ski area has cross country ski runs and a small vertical drop (325 ft) and features five rope tows and seven ski runs, including a "baby" hill. There is a small ski-chalet with indoor bathrooms and a kitchen where volunteers make food and offer it for sale to support the operations of the ski hill. Getting to Kettlebowl is a short ride on Hwy 52 from Antigo, Wisconsin. On weekends when the ski hill is open, a bus service is available to carry local children.

During the 2008-2009 season, 3,881 skiers and snowboarders came through the gates, an average of 185 per day.  Cost as of 2012-2013 was $3 for children, and $5 for adults for a day of skiing.  The hill is open on Saturdays and Sundays from noon to 4 pm when snow is available.

External links
Wisconsin Department of Tourism description of Kettlebowl
SkiResorts.org Listing for Kettlebowl

References

Buildings and structures in Langlade County, Wisconsin
Ski areas and resorts in Wisconsin
Tourist attractions in Langlade County, Wisconsin